"Vissla med mig" is a 2013 Swedish language song by Swedish band Panetoz and their follow-up single to the chart topping hit single "Dansa Pausa". The single was produced by Anders Lundström and released on 22 April 2013 with Warner Music Sweden.

An English language version was also released as "Whistle with Me".

Charts

References

2013 songs
Swedish-language songs